Petrus Francois Smith (born 29 July 1972 in Lichtenburg, South Africa) is a former South African international rugby union player. He is now the head coach for Glasgow Warriors. 
 His regular playing position was fly-half or centre.

Playing career

Youth

Smith went to Hoërskool Sand du Plessis in Bloemfontein, where he earned a selection to the  Under-18 Craven Week team in 1990. In 1991 and 1992, he regularly appeared for the Free State Under-20 side, as well as for the University of the Free State's rugby team, Shimlas. He also captained a South African Universities team that played against a South African Army XV.

Free State Cheetahs

He made his first class debut in September 1992, playing at centre for the 's match against  in Round Two of the 1992 Lion Cup competition. He remained with the Bloemfontein-based outfit until 1995, mainly appearing for their B team or as a replacement.

Griquas

In 1996, Smith joined Kimberley-based side . After one season playing for Griquas, Smith played himself into Springbok contention and was named in a 36-man squad at the end of the year. He toured with the Springboks to Argentina, Wales and France and featured in several tour matches, but did not feature in any test matches.

Bulls / Blue Bulls

He quickly established himself in the team and was also the leading South African points scorer at a point during the competition before a knee injury forced him to miss the final four rounds.

Newport

In August 1999, it was announced that Smith would join Welsh Premier Division side Newport. He made 27 appearances for them, scoring 38 points.

Return to Bulls / Blue Bulls

Pumas / Bologna / Bulls

Treviso

Smith returned to Italy to join Treviso at the end of 2002. He remained there for four seasons, making 60 appearances for the side. During his time at the club, he won the National Championship of Excellence with them in 2002–2003 and in 2003–2004 and also won the Coppa Italia in 2005.

Return to Free State Cheetahs

He retired at the end of 2005 to become the backline coach for the Free State Cheetahs.

South Africa

Smith played nine test matches for South Africa. He made his debut on 6 December 1997 against  and his last test match was on 7 August 1999 against .

Test history 

Legend: pen = penalty (3 pts.); conv = conversion (2 pts.), drop = drop kick (3 pts.).

Coaching career

Free State Cheetahs

Treviso

After 18 months in that job, he returned to Italy to take over as head coach of former side Treviso. He guided them to two National Championship of Excellence titles in 2008–2009 and in 2009–2010, as well as one Coppa Italia in 2010 and one Italian Supercup in 2009. He resigned in December 2013.

Shimlas / Free State Cheetahs / Cheetahs

He was also appointed as the head coach of university side  and he guided them to their first ever Varsity Cup championship in his first season in charge of the side.

Italy

On 21 November 2019, Franco Smith was named as Italy's interim head coach following the resignation of Conor O'Shea. Smith coached the team during their 2020 Six Nations Championship campaign. He appointment was made permanent on 1 June 2020. On 19 May 2021, it was announced that Smith would step up to a new role as Head of High Performance focusing on all levels of domestic and international rugby for the Italian federation. He was replaced as head coach by Kieran Crowley.

Glasgow Warriors

On 2 August 2022 it was announced that Smith would be the Head Coach of Glasgow Warriors, replacing their former coach Danny Wilson. Smith said of the move: "I have followed Glasgow for a long time, since coaching at Benetton when they joined the PRO12 in 2010, and the way they play has always appealed to me because their style is embraced by the fans."

References

South African rugby union coaches
South African rugby union players
Living people
1972 births
People from Lichtenburg
South African people of British descent
Rugby union fly-halves
Rugby union centres
Blue Bulls players
Bulls (rugby union) players
Free State Cheetahs players
Griquas (rugby union) players
Pumas (Currie Cup) players
South Africa international rugby union players
Rugby union players from North West (South African province)
Glasgow Warriors coaches